Kinshuk Mahajan (born 17 April 1995) is an Indian actor who primarily works in Hindi television. Mahajan earned wider recognition with his portrayal of Ranveer Rajvansh in Sapna Babul Ka... Bidaai and Gautam Pandya in Pandya Store. He is a recipient of a Gold Award, along with other nominations.

Mahajan made his acting debut with the film Delhii Heights and his TV debut with Dhoom Machaao Dhoom, portraying Adiraj Sherawat, both in 2007. He then portrayed Viren Sood in Chand Chupa Badal Mein. Mahajan's other notable work include portraying Rudra in Naagin 2 and Ishaan Khanna in Silsila Badalte Rishton Ka.

Early life and education
Mahajan was born on 17 April 1986 in New Delhi. He completed his schooling from Delhi Public School, Greater Noida. Mahajan then completed his graduation from the Asian Academy of Film and Television, Noida.

Personal life
Mahajan got engaged to his longtime girlfriend Divya Gupta in 2010. He married Gupta on 12 November 2011, in Delhi. On 7 October 2017, they were blessed with twins, named Ssahir and Saishaa.

Career

Debut and breakthrough (2007-2013)

Mahajan made his acting debut in 2007 with the Hindi film, Delhii Heights. The same year, he made his TV debut with Dhoom Machaao Dhoom, portraying Adiraj Sherawat from 2007 to 2008. It was his first major appearance. 

In 2007, he also portrayed Devendra opposite Chahat Khanna in Kaajjal. He then portrayed Kamal Thakral in Bhabhi.

From 2008 to 2010, he portrayed Ranveer Rajvansh in Sapna Babul Ka... Bidaai, opposite Parul Chauhan. It proved as a major turning point in his career. Mahajan won Gold Award for Debut in a Lead Role (Male) for his performance.

From 2010 to 2011, Mahanjan portrayed Viren Sood opposite Neha Sargam in Chand Chupa Badal Mein. The show was introduced by Javed Akhtar.

From 2011 to 2012, he portrayed Pintu Singh in Afsar Bitiya, opposite Mitali Nag. In 2011, he participated as a Contestant on the travel show, Jee Le Ye Pal.

Expansion and various roles (2014-2019)

In 2014, Mahajan portrayed Inspector Vinod More in Encounter. From 2014 to 2015, he portrayed Abhimanyu Maheshwari, opposite Shefali Sharma in Tum Aise Hi Rehna.

In 2015, he portrayed Tilak Rajawat in Tere Sheher Mein opposite Hiba Nawab. From 2015 to 2016, he portrayed Ashok and Uday in two episodes of Savdhaan India. 

In 2016, he portrayed Karan in an episode of Pyaar Tune Kya Kiya. From 2016 to 2017, Mahajan portrayed Rudra, a shape-shifting serpent opposite Mouni Roy in Naagin 2.

Mahajan portrayed Vivek in 2017, in Jaana Na Dil Se Door. From 2017 to 2018, he portrayed Aarav Randhawa in Bhootu, opposite Sana Amin Sheikh.

From 2018 to 2019, Mahajan portrayed Veer oppsite Sana Saeed and Suyyash opposite Parvati Sehgal in two episodes of Laal Ishq. 

He portrayed Ishaan Khanna opposite Aditi Sharma in Silsila Badalte Rishton Ka from 2018 to 2019. In 2019, he portrayed Akshay Kapoor in Gathbandhan opposite Shruti Sharma.

Success and recent work (2020-present)

Mahajan earned wider recognition and praises with his portrayal of Gautam Pandya in Pandya Store, opposite Shiny Doshi. He is seen portraying Gautam Pandya, since January 2021. 

In 2022, he reprised Gautam Pandya in the game show Ravivaar With Star Parivaar.

Filmography

Films

Television

Special appearances

Accolades

See also
List of Indian television actors

References

External links

 

Living people
1986 births
Delhi Public School alumni
Indian male models
Indian male television actors
Male actors from Delhi
Male actors in Hindi television